Ava is an unincorporated community in Randolph County, Alabama, United States.

Demographics
According to the returns from 1850-2010 for Alabama, Ava has never reported a population figure separately on the U.S. Census.

Notes

Unincorporated communities in Randolph County, Alabama
Unincorporated communities in Alabama